Rafťáci is a Czech comedy film directed by Karel Janák released in 2006.

Cast
Vojtěch Kotek as Dany
Jiří Mádl as Filip
Milan Šteindler as Dany's father
Veronika Freimanová as Dany's mother
Oldřich Navrátil as Borek
Jan Antonín Duchoslav as Turek
Pavla Tomicová as Filip's mother
Jiřina Jirásková as Dany's granny
Petr Čtvrtníček as Lifeguard
Jiří Helekal as Grey wolf
Pavel Nový as Firemen's chief
Jiří Ployhar as Fireman Bouchac
Boris Hybner as Therapist
Matyáš Valenta as Honzík
Andrea Kerestešová as Klára

References

External links
 

2006 films
2006 comedy films
Czech comedy films
2000s Czech-language films
2000s Czech films
Czech teen films